The following list contains calendar of saints observed by the Orthodox Tewahedo Church, the Ethiopian Orthodox Tewahedo Church and Eritrean Orthodox Tewahedo Church.  It includes both annual feast days and calendar of saints by month.

Annual feasts 
 November 30 – Saint Mary 
 August 7–22 – Filseta 
 May 9 – Lideta Maryam 
 November 21/June 19 – Michael the Archangel

Regular saint days per month

References

Ethiopian Orthodox Tewahedo Church
Eritrean Orthodox Tewahedo Church
Saints days